Blast! was a British comics magazine published by John Brown Publishing that ran monthly for seven issues from June to November 1991. Blast! featured comics by British, European, and American contributors. It was edited by Stuart Green, with Fiona Jerome and Dave Elliot.

Recurring strips in Blast! included Warren Ellis &  D'Israeli's Lazarus Churchyard, Marya Muerta & Yan Shimony's Big Berta, Glenn Dakin's War, an English translation of Enrique Sánchez Abulí & Jordi Bernet's Torpedo 1936, and reprints of Paul Chadwick's Concrete and Michael T. Gilbert's Mr. Monster. Blast! featured some of the earliest published work by such notable creators as Warren Ellis and Gordon Rennie.

The first five issues included a 16-page insert of Speakeasy, the remnants of the long-running comics news & reviews magazine. The final two issues featured articles and reviews alongside the comic strips.

Each issue ran 64 pages with a color cover, black-and-white interior pages, and was labeled for mature readers.

Issues

See also 
 Crisis
 Deadline
 Revolver

Notes

References

1991 comics debuts
1991 comics endings
British comics titles
Comics anthologies
Defunct British comics